Walter J. Floss Jr. (February 13, 1923 – December 8, 2018) was an American politician from New York.

Life

Floss was born on February 13, 1923, in Buffalo, New York. He attended Buffalo Technical High School. He served in the U.S. Navy from June 1941 to 1945.  Afterwards he engaged in the insurance business in East Amherst, New York. He married Grayce T. Thornberry (1924–2004), and they had ten children.

Floss entered politics as a Republican, and was a member of the Town Council of Clarence from 1963 to 1967, and a member of the Erie County Legislature from 1968 to 1978.

Floss was a member of the New York State Senate from 1979 to 1988, sitting in the 183rd, 184th, 185th, 186th and 187th New York State Legislatures. In 1986, he sponsored the law that made it possible to use credit cards at liquor stores in the State of New York.

Floss died on December 8, 2018 at the age of 95.

References

1923 births
2018 deaths
County legislators in New York (state)
Politicians from Buffalo, New York
Businesspeople from Buffalo, New York
Military personnel from Buffalo, New York
Republican Party New York (state) state senators
20th-century American businesspeople